Morafeno (Maroantsetra) is a town and commune in Madagascar. It belongs to the district of Maroantsetra, which is a part of Analanjirofo Region. The population of the commune was estimated to be approximately 5,699 in 2018.

References and notes 

Populated places in Analanjirofo